This is the discography documenting albums and singles released by New Kids On The Block member Jordan Knight.

Albums

Studio albums

Remix albums
 Jordan Knight Performs New Kids on the Block: The Remix Album (2004)

Collaborative albums

Extended plays
 The Fix (2005)

Singles

Other charted songs

Other songs
 "Angel of Love" featuring Ana (Body Language)
 "Can I Come Over Tonight?" (also a bonus track on the UK edition of Jordan Knight)
 "My Heart's Saying Now" (Snow Day soundtrack)
 "Your Vibe" (Popstar soundtrack)
 "One on One" (Best Buy bonus track from Love Songs, Hall & Oates cover).

References

New Kids on the Block
Pop music group discographies